The Fear is a 2015 French war drama film directed by Damien Odoul.  The film won the 2015 Cinema of France award Prix Jean Vigo, and was screened in the Contemporary World Cinema section of the 2015 Toronto International Film Festival.

Plot
Gabriel Dufour (Nino Rocher) is a young conscript in the French Army during the First World War.  Along with fellow conscripts from his small town, he is sent to the front in 1914.  Through the trials, horrors, and tribulations of war, he survives and discovers his own humanity.

Cast

 Nino Rocher as Gabriel Dufour
 Pierre Martial Gaillard as Nègre
 Théo Chazal as Théophile
 Eliott Margueron as Bertrand
 Frédéric Buffaras as Lespinasse
 Jonathan Jimeno Romera as La Gaufre
 Charles Josse as Fouchet
 Aniouta Maïdel as Marguerite
 Patrick de Valette as Ferdinand
 Yarrow Martin as Perreault
 Amélie Martinez as Joséphine

Production
Secretly shot from 15 September through 24 October 2015, on locations in Canada, filming completed and the film entered post-production in late November.  The film represents Damien Odoul's seventh feature film.

Reception
Abus de Cine  noted in-depth films covering World War I from a French viewpoint were rare, and noted La Peur as ambitious.  While the reviewer felt the film was uneven in its interpretation, he felt it was worth watching.

While also noting an unevenness in interpretation, La Croix praised the director for immersing the viewer into the war from a uniquely French perspective, and the work of actor Nino Rocher in the lead role.

Libération noted director Damien Odoul's success in capturing the horrors of trench warfare through his graphic film adaptation of the memoirs of a survivor of "The Great War".

Le Figaro wrote that the film was remarkable in its retelling of the fears and horrors suffered by French soldiers during World War I.

France 24 praised director Damien Odoul for his unfettered depictions of the true horrors seen and suffered by French soldiers from 1914 through 1918 in the trenches of World War I.  While it was felt the director took liberties in his adaptation of the Gabriel Chevallier novel, the changes were as the filmmaker intended in order to contemporize the history being told.

Awards and nominations
 2015, won the Cinema of France Prix Jean Vigo award.

References

External links
 

2015 films
2015 drama films
2015 war drama films
2010s French-language films
French war drama films
Western Front (World War I) films
French World War I films
Films about fear
2010s French films
Films scored by Colin Stetson